Lothair Udo I (950 – 23 June 994), Count of Stade, son of Henry I the Bald, Count of Stade, and his wife Judith von der Wetterau, granddaughter of Gebhard, Duke of Lorraine.  Lothair is frequently confused with his nephew Lothair Udo II, son of his brother Siegfried II, who was Margrave of Nordmark as Lothair Udo I.

The writings of Thietmar of Merseburg describe the deaths of his three maternal uncles Henry, Udo [Lothair Udo I] and Siegfried, captured by pirates with Count Adalgar, and reported that Udo was killed in battle with the Vikings.

Lothair married an unknown daughter of Siegbert, Count of Liesgau, and had two children:
 Henry III von Stade, Canon at Hildesheim Cathedral, after 1002
 Udo von Stade (986-1040), Count of Liesgau and Rittegau, married to Bertrada of an unknown family.  Their son Dietrich I von Kahleberg was killed in the Battle of Werben on 10 September 1056.  Dietrich married Bertrada, daughter of Dirk III, Count of Holland.

It is unclear as to when Lothair served as count as he died before his brother Henry.  The German Wikipedia article on the counts, Grafschaft_Stade, does not list him as count whereas the Medieval Lands Project, Grafen von Stade, does.

References

Sources 
 Warner, David A., Ottonian Germany: The Chronicon of Thietmar of Merseburg, Manchester University Press, Manchester, 2001
 Reuter, Timothy, Germany in the Early Middle Ages, 800-1036, London and New York, 1992
 Bury, J. B. (editor), The Cambridge Medieval History: Volume III, Germany and the Western Empire, Cambridge University Press, 1922
 Hucke, Richard G., Die Grafen von Stade 900-1144. Genealogie, politische Stellung, Comitat und Allodialbesitz der sächsischen Udonen; Diss. Kiel, Stade mit umfassenden Nachweisen der Quellen und älteren Literatur, 1956
 Medieval Lands Project, Grafen von Stade (family of Lothar)

Counts of Stade
950 births
994 deaths
10th-century Saxon people
People killed by pirates